William Arnott (6 December 182722 July 1901) was the Scottish founder of the Arnott's Biscuits Holdings (now Arnott's Biscuits Limited) in Australia.

Early life
William Arnott was born 6 December 1827, in Pathhead, Fife, Scotland, the eldest of eight children. His father was David Millie and his mother was Isobella Arnott. In October 1847, he and his brother David set out for Sydney, Australia on board the assisted-immigrants' ship Sir Edward Parry; they reached Sydney some 135 days later, on 17 February 1848.

Career

Arnott's Biscuits

After arriving in Australia, he first started a baking company in Morpeth, New South Wales, 22 miles north-west of Newcastle. He continued working as a baker, together with David, for three years. Arnott decided to try his luck gold mining in 1851, and left for the Turon River diggings alone. He was not successful; he failed to find any gold and eventually returned to life as a baker. In 1865, Arnott established the William Arnott's Steam Biscuit Factory in Newcastle, New South Wales. It was so named as his biscuit-making machines (or "rotary ovens") were steam-powered. In 1894, Arnott employed numerous workers after purchasing a biscuit factory in Forest Lodge, Sydney; his biscuits had already begun shipping to Sydney in 1882. The factory in Forest Lodge was relocated to Homebush circa 1908. During his career as a biscuit manufacturer, Arnott came up with the Milk Arrowroot biscuits, a combination of arrowroot biscuits and plain milk biscuits; they were marketed as "children's food" and were very popular, to the extent that other rival companies tried to come up with imitations of the Milk Arrowroot biscuits. Arnott also produced Tim Tam, Jatz and SAO biscuits.

Personal life

William Arnott was a prominent member of the Wesleyan Church and taught Sunday school for close to 25 years. In 1848, Arnott wed Monica Sinclair, who already had four children at the time of the marriage; Sinclair died aged 36 on 11 April 1865. That same year, Arnott married Margarete McLean Fleming. She assisted him in his baking business and they had eight children.
A rather surprising and widespread omission from William Arnott biographies (including the major article on him in 1968 in the Australian Dictionary of Biography [Volume 3, Melbourne University Press] by Phyllis Mander-Jones who is a descendant of his, and also in histories of the Arnotts Biscuits company, has been any mention of the convict heritage of this Australian Arnott family.  Yet the details of such have been clearly published in places.  For example, the author Malcolm David Prentis published in 1983, in "The Scots in Australia", that the most famous Scots lay Methodist was biscuit-maker William Arnott; and that he was son of David Millie Arnott who had been transported here for breach of trust, fraud and embezzlement following sentence in 1837.

Death and legacy
On 22 July 1901, Arnott died at his ‘Arnottholme’ residence. aged 73. Shortly after his death, Arnott's sons spread out the business to other parts of the world, including East Asia and South Africa.

References

1827 births
1901 deaths
Australian food industry businesspeople
Australian people of Scottish descent
19th-century Australian businesspeople
Australian bakers
People from Kirkcaldy